Gamma Trianguli (Gamma Tri, γ Trianguli, γ Tri) is a star in the constellation Triangulum located approximately 112 light years from Earth. It has an apparent magnitude of +4.01 and forms an optical (line-of-sight) triple with Delta Trianguli and 7 Trianguli.

Properties
This star has a stellar classification of A1Vnn, which indicates it is an A-type main sequence star. It has 2.7 times the mass of the Sun and nearly double the Sun's radius. Gamma Trianguli is radiating about 33 times the luminosity of the Sun from its outer envelope at an effective temperature of 9,440 K, giving the star a white hue. The star is roughly 300 million years old.

Rotation
It is rotating rapidly, with a projected rotational velocity of 254 km/s along the equator, which causes the star to take the pronounced shape of an oblate spheroid like Altair. Because the inclination of the star's axial tilt is unknown, this means that the azimuthal equatorial velocity is at least this amount and possibly higher. By comparison, the Sun is a slow rotator with an equatorial azimuthal velocity of 2 km/s. The doppler shift from the rapid rotation results in very diffuse absorption lines in the star's spectrum, as indicated by the 'nn' in the classification.

Debris disk
Orbiting the star is a dusty debris disk with a combined mass of about  times the mass of the Earth. This disk can be detected because it is being heated to a temperature of about 75 K by Gamma Trianguli and is radiating this as infrared energy. The disk is separated from the host star by an angle of 2.24 arcseconds, corresponding to a physical radius of 80 AU, or 80 times the separation of the Earth from the Sun.

Naming

References

Trianguli, Gamma
Triangulum (constellation)
A-type main-sequence stars
010670
Trianguli, 09
0664
014055
Durchmusterung objects